Sardarzahi or  Sardarzāi (Persian: سردارزهی) (Balochi: سددازهی) (حمید الله سردارزهی) refers to sardars , rulers or Hakomzāts in south eastern province of Baluchistan of Iran. Sardarzahis were originally from Jadgal ancestry. The Jadgal claim to have immigrated from Sind some ten generations ago to the most extreme southeastern corner of Iranian Baluchistan which is currently a part of Dashtiari and bahu districts in Chabahar County.
حمید الله سردارزهی
Sardar Hamidollah Sardarzahi is the Sardar of Sardazahies. He is the son of Mir Mullahdad Sardarzahi. Mir Mullahdad Sardarzahi was among the biggest baloch leaders of the Balochistan.

Some famous Sardarzahi include:
 Yar Mohammad khan 2 zami
 Mir Abdi Khan
 Mir Mehrab Khan
 Mir Mahrullah Khan
 Mir Abdul Raheman sardarzai (late)
 Mir Murad baksh karachi (late)
 Mir Mola baksh sardarzai kalar shak sindh
 Mir Khuda baksh Gadap
 Mir Saeed (dukh Iran) 
 Mir Abdul Qadir mola bakhsh kalar shakh
 M.Hanif saddazai (son of Khuda Baksh saddazai Gadap)
 Mir Karim
 Yousaf Saddazai (son of Mir Mola baksh kalar shak sindh)
 Mir Ghulam Qadir sindh
 Noor Muhammad sadazai

Related links
Hakom
Boledehi
Chabahar
Bahu district
gwatar

Sistan and Baluchestan Province